Kurt Richter (1885–1960) was an Austrian art director of the silent era. He designed the sets for more than a hundred films during his career, including a number made by the leading German company UFA where he frequently collaborated with director Ernst Lubitsch.

Selected filmography

 The White Terror (1917)
 Lulu (1917)
 The Ballet Girl (1918)
 The Toboggan Cavalier (1918)
 Struggling Souls (1918)
 I Don't Want to Be a Man (1918)
 The Rosentopf Case (1918)
 The Lady, the Devil and the Model (1918)
 The Seeds of Life (1918)
 The Teahouse of the Ten Lotus Flowers (1919)
 The Dagger of Malaya (1919)
 The Merry Husband (1919)
 A Drive into the Blue (1919)
 Madame DuBarry (1919)
 The Oyster Princess (1919)
 The Howling Wolf (1919)
 The Panther Bride (1919)
 The Galley Slave (1919)
 The Woman at the Crossroads (1919)
 Countess Doddy (1919)
 The Daughter of Mehemed (1919)
 The Man of Action (1919)
 Indian Revenge (1920)
 Sumurun (1920)
 Mascotte (1920)
 Anna Boleyn (1920)
 The Lady in Black (1920)
 The Marquise of Armiani (1920)
 Rebel Liesel (1920)
 Love at the Wheel (1921)
 The Sins of the Mother (1921)
 The Lost Shadow (1921)
 The Sacrifice of Ellen Larsen (1921)
 The Secret of the Mummy (1921)
 Peter Voss, Thief of Millions (1921)
 The Bull of Olivera (1921)
 Monna Vanna (1922)
 Maciste and the Javanese (1922)
 The Girl with the Mask (1922)
 A Night's Adventure (1923)
 All for Money (1923)
 Count Cohn (1923)
 The House by the Sea (1924)
 The Fake Emir (1924)
 The Creature (1924)
 The Woman with That Certain Something (1925)
 Love and Trumpets (1925)
 A Woman for 24 Hours (1925)
 The Love Trap (1925)
 Rags and Silk (1925)
 Adventure on the Night Express (1925)
 The Girl on the Road (1925)
 The Marriage Swindler (1925)
 The Black Pierrot (1926)
 Princess Trulala (1926)
 I Stand in the Dark Midnight (1927)
 Marie's Soldier (1927)
 A Day of Roses in August (1927)
 Circus Beely (1927)
 The Awakening of Woman (1927)
 Serenissimus and the Last Virgin (1928)
 Honeymoon (1928)
 The Woman from Till 12 (1928)
 He Goes Right, She Goes Left! (1928)
 It Attracted Three Fellows (1928)
 Polish Economy (1928)
 In Werder the Trees are in Bloom (1928)
 Dive (1929)
 What a Woman Dreams of in Springtime (1929)

References

Bibliography
 Hake, Sabine. Passions and Deceptions: The Early Films of Ernst Lubitsch. Princeton University Press, 1992.

External links

1885 births
1960 deaths
Austrian art directors